WNBB (97.9 FM) is a radio station airing a classic country music format. Licensed to Bayboro, North Carolina, United States, it serves the Greenville-New Bern area.  The station is currently owned by Coastal Carolina Radio.

History
The station went on the air as WBHU on 1998-09-18.  on 2000-11-06, the station changed its call sign to WRUP, on 2003-11-21 to the current WNBB.

From 2004 to 2015 the station was simulcast on WNBR-FM.

References

External links

NBB